M37 or M-37 may refer to:

 M-37 (Michigan highway), a state highway in Michigan
 M37 (Johannesburg), a Metropolitan Route in Johannesburg, South Africa
 M37 (Pretoria), a Metropolitan Route in Pretoria, South Africa
 M37 (Durban), a Metropolitan Route in Durban, South Africa
 M37 highway, a highway in Turkmenistan
 Dodge M37, a military truck
 Ithaca M37, an American shotgun
 Messier 37, a star cluster
 82-BM-37, an infantry mortar
 Infiniti M37, a Japanese luxury car
 M37 machine gun. Cal. .30 Browning adapted for tank use. M1919 Browning machine gun
 M37 105 mm Howitzer Motor Carriage, Developed from M24 Chaffee to replace the M7
 Ruleville-Drew Airport
 Smith & Wesson Model 37, a model sold and used by Japanese police departments.